2 Samuel 10 is the tenth chapter of the Second Book of Samuel in the Old Testament of the Christian Bible or the second part of Books of Samuel in the Hebrew Bible. According to Jewish tradition the book was attributed to the prophet Samuel, with additions by the prophets Gad and Nathan, but modern scholars view it as a composition of a number of independent texts of various ages from c. 630–540 BCE. This chapter contains the account of David's reign in Jerusalem. This is within a section comprising 2 Samuel 9–20 and continued to 1 Kings 1–2 which deal with the power struggles among David's sons to succeed David's throne until 'the kingdom was established in the hand of Solomon' (1 Kings 2:46).

Text
This chapter was originally written in the Hebrew language. It is divided into 19 verses.

Textual witnesses
Some early manuscripts containing the text of this chapter in Hebrew are of the Masoretic Text tradition, which includes the Codex Cairensis (895), Aleppo Codex (10th century), and Codex Leningradensis (1008). Fragments containing parts of this chapter in Hebrew were found among the Dead Sea Scrolls including 4Q51 (4QSam; 100–50 BCE) with extant verses 4–7, 18–19.

Extant ancient manuscripts of a translation into Koine Greek known as the Septuagint (originally was made in the last few centuries BCE) include Codex Vaticanus (B; B; 4th century) and Codex Alexandrinus (A; A; 5th century).

Old Testament references
:

Analysis
The historic wars with Ammon and Aram are recorded in 2 Samuel 10–12 in connection with the David-Bathsheba affair and the succession narrative thereafter.

This chapter comprises 3 parts:
 Humiliation of David's envoys by the Ammonites (10:1–5)
 Joab's victory over the Ammonites (10:6–14)
 David's victory over the Arameans (10:15–19)

At the center of the chapter, Joab, David's commander, prayed for divine assistance: "may the Lord do what seems good to him" (verse 12) and God heard his prayer, confirming that God helps David (and his army) "wherever he went" (2 Samuel 8:6, 14).

Humiliation of David's envoys by the Ammonites (10:1–5)
The section begins with a Hebrew clause "wayehî ’a-ḥă-rê-ḵên", "and-happened after this" ("after this" or "and it came to pass"), indicating an indeterminate period of time since the events of the last chapter. The death of Nahash the king of the Ammonites, an ally of David, prompted David to send a mourning delegate to pay his respects and to maintain a good relationship with Hanun, Nahash's son and successor, but Hanun who suspected David's motives, humiliated the envoys.
It was not uncommon in the region that during the transition of power a neighboring kingdom would attack an inexperienced king, just as the Philistines tried to attack David upon his anointing in Hebron (2 Samuel 2:1), or the Moabites rebelled against Ahaziah the new king of Israel, when Ahab, his father, was dead (2 Kings 1:1; 3:5).

The structure of this section is as follows:
Setting (10:1)
A. David sends envoys (10:2)
B. Hanun hears accusations against the envoys (10:3a)
C. The accusations (10:3b)
B'. Hanun believes the accusations and humuliates the envoys (10:4)
A'. David's sends word to the envoys (9:5)

The episode begins and ends in David's court, while the central event happens in Hanun's court.

Verse 2
Then David said, "I will show kindness to Hanun the son of Nahash, as his father showed kindness to me."
So David sent by the hand of his servants to comfort him concerning his father. And David’s servants came into the land of the people of Ammon.
"Show kindness": in Hebrew "khesed", which can be rendered as "do loyalty" (twice in this verse; cf. 2 Samuel 9:1).
Nahash, king of the Ammonites, was Saul's enemy in 1 Samuel 11, so it is reasonable that he favored David. Nahash attacked Jabesh-Gilead in c. 1049 BCE, so until his death in c. 998 BCE, he must have reigned at least 51 years.

Joab's victory over the Ammonites (10:6–14)
Facing imminent retaliation from David for the humiliation of Israelite envoys, the Ammonites asked help from the Arameans (verse 6), which turned attention to four Aramean states: Zobah and Beth-rehob to the south, Maacah (Aram-Maacah in 1 Chronicles 19:6) north of Manasseh in Transjordan, and Tob, further south. Comparing with the narrative in 2 Samuel 8:3–5, the course of the Aramean conflict could be reconstructed as follows: 
 a first battle outside the gate of Rabbah (10:6–14); 
 a second battle in the region of Helem in northern Gilead (10:15–19);
 a final and decisive battle in which Hadadezer's coalition was conquered (8:3–8).

Joab successfully fought battle in Rabbah on two fronts, but was not in a position to take more advantage, so he returned to Jerusalem (verse 14).

Verse 14
When the Ammonites saw the Arameans flee, they fled before his brother Abishai  and went into the city. Joab withdrew from fighting the Ammonites and returned to Jerusalem.
"Joab withdrew from fighting the Ammonites and returned to Jerusalem": in Hebrew: "“and Joab returned from against the sons of Ammon and entered Jerusalem.”

David's victory over the Arameans (10:15–19)
The fight under the leadership of David himself gave a much better result: the Syrians fled before David, who killed many of them, including Shobach, Hadadezer's commander (verse 18), effectively neutralizing the power of Aram. After this defeat Hadadezer's vassals transferred their allegiance to David (verse 19).

Verse 19
And when all the kings who were servants of Hadadezer saw that they had been defeated by Israel, they made peace with Israel and became subject to them. So the Syrians were afraid to save the Ammonites anymore.
There is a Hebrew wordplay in this verse: Hadarezer's servants "see" (wayyir'u) that they are defeated, so the Syrians (Arameans) "fear" (wayyire'u) to help the Ammonites again.

See also

Related Bible parts: 1 Samuel 11, 2 Samuel 8, 1 Chronicles 19

Notes

References

Sources

Commentaries on Samuel

General

External links
 Jewish translations:
 Samuel II - II Samuel - Chapter 10 (Judaica Press). Hebrew text and English translation [with Rashi's commentary] at Chabad.org
 Christian translations:
 Online Bible at GospelHall.org (ESV, KJV, Darby, American Standard Version, Bible in Basic English)
 2 Samuel chapter 10. Bible Gateway

10